Tieling West railway station  is a railway station on the Harbin–Dalian section of the Beijing–Harbin high-speed railway. It is in Fanhe Town, Tieling, Liaoning province, China. It opened along with the Harbin–Dalian high-speed railway on 1 December 2012.

See also
Tieling railway station
Chinese Eastern Railway
South Manchuria Railway
South Manchuria Railway Zone
Changchun Light Rail Transit

References

Railway stations in Tieling
Railway stations in Liaoning
Railway stations in China opened in 2012